Abraham John Bond Jr., known as Son Bonds (March 16, 1909 – August 31, 1947), was an American country blues guitarist, singer and songwriter. He was a working associate of Sleepy John Estes and Hammie Nixon. He was similar to Estes in his guitar-playing style. According to the music journalist Jim O'Neal, "the music to one of Bonds's songs, 'Back and Side Blues' (1934), became a standard blues melody when Sonny Boy Williamson I, from nearby Jackson, Tennessee, used it in his classic "Good Morning, School Girl". The best-known of Bonds's other works are "A Hard Pill to Swallow" and "Come Back Home."

Biography
Bonds was born in Brownsville, Tennessee. He was also billed on records as "Brownsville" Son Bonds and Brother Son Bonds.

Sleepy John Estes, in his earlier recordings, was backed by Yank Rachell (mandolin) or Hammie Nixon (harmonica), but by the late 1930s he was accompanied in the recording studio by either Bonds or Charlie Pickett (guitar). Bonds also backed Estes on a couple of recording sessions in 1941. In return, either Estes or Nixon played on every one of Bonds's own recordings. In the latter part of his career, Bonds played the kazoo as well as the guitar on several tracks.

According to Nixon's later accounts of the event, Bonds suffered an accidental death in August 1947. While sitting on his front porch late one evening in Dyersburg, Tennessee, Bonds was shot to death by his nearsighted neighbor, who mistook him for another man, with whom the neighbor was having a protracted disagreement.

Discography
Complete Recorded Works in Chronological Order (1991), Wolf Records
This compilation album contains all known recordings by Bonds, made between September 1934 and September 1941.

See also
List of blues musicians
List of country blues musicians

References

1909 births
1947 deaths
People from Brownsville, Tennessee
Blues musicians from Tennessee
American blues guitarists
American male guitarists
American blues singers
Singers from Tennessee
Songwriters from Tennessee
Country blues musicians
Firearm accident victims in the United States
Accidental deaths in Tennessee
Deaths by firearm in Tennessee
20th-century American singers
20th-century American guitarists
Guitarists from Tennessee
People from Dyersburg, Tennessee
20th-century American male singers
American male songwriters